Austrasiatica is a genus of sea snails, marine gastropod mollusks in the family Cypraeidae, the cowries.

Species
Species within the genus Austrasiatica include:
Austrasiatica alexhuberti Lorenz and Huber, 2000
Austrasiatica deforgesi Lorenz, 2002
Austrasiatica hirasei (Roberts, 1913)
Austrasiatica langfordi (Kuroda, 1938)
Austrasiatica sakurai (Habe, 1970)
Species brought into synonymy
 Austrasiatica sakurai [sic]: synonym of Austrasiatica sakuraii (Habe, 1970) (misspelling)

References

 Meyer, C.P. (2004) Toward comprehensiveness: Increased molecular sampling within Cypraeidae and its phylogenetic implications. Malacologia 46(1): 127-156. page(s): 132

Cypraeidae
Gastropod genera